Víctor Eduardo Ceferino Bernay (born 4 April 1970) is an Argentine football coach.

Career
Born in Concordia, Entre Ríos, Bernay played youth football for Club Atlético Victoria de Concordia as a youth, making his senior debut at the age of 16 while being the club's fitness coach. He later studied accounting before moving to physical education. He also had a short spell at Newell's Old Boys' youth setup, but had to leave due to military service.

Bernay began his managerial career at CA Ferrocarril de Concordia before moving to Atlético Uruguay. He left the latter club on 30 December 2005, to join Pedro Troglio's staff at Gimnasia La Plata.

Bernay continued to work with Troglio in the following seasons, being his assistant at Independiente, Cerro Porteño, Argentinos Juniors, Gimnasia (two stints), Tigre and Universitario.

In April 2019, Bernay was named Secretary of Sports of his hometown. He left the post in June to return to Cerro Porteño, being a youth football coordinator while in charge of the youth categories.

On 8 October 2019, Bernay was named first team manager in an interim manager for the remainder of the season. He returned to his previous role in December, after nine matches.

On 23 February 2021, Bernay was appointed Ariel Holan's assistant at Santos.

Managerial statistics

References

External links
 

1970 births
Living people
Argentine football managers
Paraguayan Primera División managers
Cerro Porteño managers
Santos FC non-playing staff
Argentine expatriate football managers
Argentine expatriate sportspeople in Paraguay
Argentine expatriate sportspeople in Brazil
Expatriate football managers in Paraguay